Nouvelle École (French: New School) is an annual political and philosophy magazine which was established by an ethno-nationalist think tank, GRECE. The publication is one of the significant media outlets of the New Right political approach in France. The director of Nouvelle École, Alain de Benoist, stated that the start of the magazine indicates the birth of the New Right.

History and profile
Nouvelle École was launched in 1968 and is directed by Alain de Benoist. Its first issue appeared on 11 March 1968. The editor-in-chief of Nouvelle École was Eric Maulin. The magazine covers a wide range of topics, including archeology, biology, sociology, literature, philosophy and history of religions. 

William H. Tucker and Bruce Lincoln described Nouvelle École as the "French version of the Mankind Quarterly", a scientific racist journal, and historian James G. Shields as the equivalent of the German scientific racist journal Neue Anthropologie.

References

External links

1968 establishments in France
Annual magazines
Conservatism in France
Conservative magazines
French-language magazines
Magazines established in 1968
Magazines published in Paris
New Right (Europe)
Philosophy magazines
Political magazines published in France